Sonne (English: Sun) is the seventh studio album under the project Schiller created by the German electronic musician Christopher Von Deylen. It is internationally marketed as Sun. On this album Schiller has collaborated with among others American multi-instrumentalist and vocalist Adam Young of Owl City and Andrea Corr of Irish band The Corrs. Furthermore, Norwegian singer and songwriter Kate Havnevik and Welsh alternative pop band Paper Aeroplanes. The album includes the two music videos Solaris and Sahara Avenue.

The Super Deluxe Edition of the new album will contain 2 CDs and 2 DVDs featuring 29 new studio productions from Christopher Von Deylen. The DVDs will include material from the Klangwelten tour, as well as an exclusive limited audience club concert in Cologne.

The album achieved gold status in Germany in 2016.

In 2013 there was a release of a Chill Out Edition of Sonne.

Track listings

Deluxe Edition 

CD I

CD II

References

2012 albums
Schiller (band) albums